The following is a list of players, both past and current, who appeared at least in one game for the Formosa Taishin Dreamers (2020–present), or Formosa Dreamers (2017–2020) franchise.



Players

A

B

C

D

F

G

H

J

K

L

M

O

P

T

W

Y

References

P. League+ all-time rosters